Davenport Hotel may refer to:

The Davenport Hotel (Dublin), Ireland
Davenport Hotel (Davenport, Iowa), a Registered Historical Place
Davenport Hotel (Franklin Township, Michigan), a Registered Historical Place in Franklin Township, Michigan
The Davenport Hotel (Spokane, Washington), a Registered Historical Place
The Davenport Hotel Collection, a parental operating brand which also includes sister properties